Senator Tuttle may refer to:

Arthur J. Tuttle (1868–1944), Michigan State Senate
John Tuttle (politician) (fl. 1970s–2010s), Maine State Senate
Oral P. Tuttle (1889–1957), Illinois State Senate